The Fourteenth Saeima of Latvia was elected in the 2022 Latvian parliamentary election held on 1 October 2022.

Election 

The 100 members of the Saeima are elected by open list proportional representation from five multi-member constituencies (Kurzeme, Latgale, Riga (in which overseas votes are counted), Vidzeme and Zemgale) between 12 and 36 seats in size. Seats are allocated using the Sainte-Laguë method with a national electoral threshold of 5%.

Composition 
This list contains all 115 MPs who have served in the Fourteenth Saeima.

References 

Saeima
Political history of Latvia
2022 establishments in Latvia
Saeima of Latvia